is a Japanese game artist and part of Spike Chunsoft's affiliation. Since 1994, he contributes to the company, with the Mystery Dungeon franchise as the main character designer for the Shiren the Wanderer series since its first title in 1995, and as an artist for other video game titles.

Career
Before working in the Mystery Dungeon franchise, Hasegawa has contributed in Kamaitachi no Yoru as an artist. He later took part during the production of Mystery Dungeon: Shiren the Wanderer for the Super Famicom. In an interview with Chunsoft, they wanted someone who could work on the then sequel of Torneko's Great Adventure: Mystery Dungeon, but he was not familiar with the title, nor the roguelike genre at the time of the interview. After being interested in the genre by playing through the game and being employed in the company, he was able work in the game. The game was set in feudal Japan, as the game's scenarist Shin-ichiro Tomie decided to set the game in this theme instead of a western art style, like Akira Toriyama's Dragon Quest characters. Many drafts were made for the silent protagonist of the eponymous game, and its mascot monster the Mamel, but most of them were lost. Since then, he has contributed to the series as a character designer, occasionally as an art director like in Shiren the Wanderer 2.

Hasegawa has taken part in few events related to the series. In 2012, during the first Nico Nico Game Master event, him and Tomie appeared in the finale of a real-time attack of the first Shiren the Wanderer game. For the 20th anniversary of the Shiren the Wanderer series, he appeared in an exhibition of the series' artworks and performed a live painting on July 11, 2015. Likewise for the series' 25th anniversary, another exhibition was hold featuring his works where he took part shortly in the event. Additionally, he has contributed a new artwork for the Steam and Nintendo Switch port of Shiren the Wanderer: The Tower of Fortune and the Dice of Fate.

Unrelated to the Mystery Dungeon franchise, he would contribute as an artist in other video games and media. One such was a towel featuring both Shiren the Wanderer′s Koppa and Danganronpa′s Monokuma during an exhibition of goods from the company and the release of Kenka Bancho Otome. Another artwork was made for the PlayStation's 20th anniversary, along with many other video game artists.

Works

Video games

Other media

References

External links
 Kaoru Hasegawa profile at MobyGames

Living people
1971 births
Video game artists